Dalbergia chapelieri is a species of legume in the family Fabaceae.
It is found only in Madagascar.
It is threatened by habitat loss.

References

chapelieri
Endemic flora of Madagascar
Vulnerable plants
Taxonomy articles created by Polbot
Taxa named by Henri Ernest Baillon